Błudnik is a demon in Slavic mythology, that dwells in the region of Łużyce. It was said to be a mischievous gnome who used to lead people astray and decoy them into swamps.

See also 

 Will-o'-the-wisp

References 

Slavic demons
Slavic legendary creatures